Mzukisi Qobo (born 8 January 1974) is Head of Wits School of Governance at the University of the Witwatersrand in South Africa. He is also a political economist and Associate Professor of Strategy and International Business at the Wits Business School. In 2019, Mzukisi Qobo was appointed by President Cyril Ramaphosa to serve on the Economic Advisory Council. In the past, he has held a senior leadership role in government as chief director responsible for developing South Africa's trade policy at the Department of Trade and Industry.

Mzukisi co-founded the Center for the Study of Governance Innovation at the University of Pretoria, South Africa and became its deputy director between 2012 and 2014. He also taught international political economy at the same university. He has served as deputy director at the NRF Chair on African Diplomacy and Foreign Policy at the University of Johannesburg between 2016 and 2018.

Between 2009 and 2010 he was Programme Head: Emerging Powers and Global Challenges at the South African Institute of International Affairs, Johannesburg. Mzukisi is formerly Chief Director at the Department of Trade and Industry where he developed South Africa's trade policy and strategy framework.

Mzukisi serves as a board member at the Corruption Watch, a corruption-fighting non-profit organisation based in Johannesburg, South Africa.

Early life 
Mzukisi was born in Langa township and grew up in Khayelitsha, South Africa. He completed his matric in Luhlaza High School.

Education 
He studied at the University of Cape Town for his Bachelor's, where he was President of the Student Representative Council in 1996. After graduating BA at the University of Cape Town in 1997 he enrolled for his master's degree in International Studies at the University of Stellenbosch where he graduated in 2000. He was actively involved in student politics and served on the National Executive Council of the South African Student Congress as National Education Officer in 1998. He would later join the Department of Trade and Industry in May 2000 as Assistant Director. He left government in 2002 to further his studies. He would earn his PhD in Politics and International Studies at the University of Warwick, UK in 2006.

Publications 
His book, co-authored with a political analyst Prince Mashele was a best seller in South Africa:  Mashele, Prince and Qobo, Mzukisi (2014). The Fall of the ANC: What Next? Johannesburg: Pan Macmillan (Picador Books).

Policy Publications 
 Mzukisi Qobo. 7 April 2020. ‘The Covid-19 Global Pandemic: How Africa Should Respond’.

Other publications 

 Qobo, Mzukisi, (co-authored with Garth Le Pere) “The Role of China in Africa’s Industrialization: The Challenge of Building Global Value Chains”, Journal of Contemporary China, Volume 27, Issue 10, 2018, pp. 208–228.
 Qobo, Mzukisi “South Africa’s Foreign Policy and Nation-Branding: Regional Leadership and its Discontent”, Journal of Strategic Review for Southern Africa, Vol 39 (1), May 2017.
 Qobo, Mzukisi (co-authored with Mills Soko), “Economic, Trade, and Development Relations between South Africa and the European Union: The End of Strategic Partnership? A South African Perspective”, South African Journal of International Affairs, Volume 24 Issue 2, 2017, pp. 137–157.
 Qobo, Mzukisi (Coauthored with Nceku Nyati),“Ubuntu, Public Policy Ethics and Tensions in South Africa's Foreign Policy”, South African Journal of International Affairs, 2016,  Volume 23 Issue 4, 421-43
 Qobo M (co-authored with Soko M). “The Role of the BRICS in Africa’s Development: Drivers and Strategies”, Journal for Contemporary History, Vol 41, No.1, April 2016.
 Qobo M (co-authored with Soko M). “The rise of emerging powers in the global development finance architecture: The case of the BRICS and the New Development Bank”, South African Journal of International Affairs, Volume 22, Issue 3, November 2015.
 Qobo, M (co-authored with Dube M). “South Africa’s Foreign Economic Strategies in a Changing Global System”, South African Journal of International Affairs, Volume 22, Issue 2, 2015, pp. 145–164.
 Qobo, M (2014). “On the Pitfalls of a Developmental State”, Strategic Review of Southern Africa, SRSA 2/14, November.
 Qobo, M (co-authored with Motsamai D). “Developmental State Construction and Strategic Regionalism: The Continental Reach of South Africa’s Development Finance Institutions”. Global Policy Journal, Volume 5 Issue 3, September 2014, pp. 353–359.
 Qobo, M (2013). “Is Environmentally Sustainable and Inclusive Growth Possible? Sub-Saharan Africa and Emerging Global Norms on Development”, South African Journal of International Affairs, Volume 20 (3), pp. 339–356.
 Qobo, M and Lindani, N (2013). “The Problem of Black Youth and Race Relations in South Africa”, New Agenda: South African Journal of Social and Economic Policy, Issue 50, Second Quarter, 2013.
 Qobo, M and Dube, Memory (2013) (Accredited). “South Africa’s Approach to the BRICS”, WeltTrends Journal of International Politics, Volume 92, September.

 Qobo, M (2011). The Role of the State and Business in Growing the Mining Sector, The New Agenda: South African Journal for Economic and Social Policy, First Quarter Issue 49.
 Qobo M (2010). “Refocusing South Africa’s Economic Diplomacy: Emerging Powers and the African Agenda”, South African Journal of International Affairs, Volume 17 (1) April, pp. 13–28.

References 

Living people
1974 births
20th-century South African economists
South African political people
Academic staff of the University of the Witwatersrand